Henry John King (1855–1934) was an Australian composer.

King was born in Emerald Hill to English settlers of Tasmania. His father of the same name was a respected musician.

He married Mary Ann Hutchens and two years later obtained a scandalous divorce from her. They had children named Harold Ernest Justiman King and Ilma Valerie Madeline King.

King was chosen to adjudicate choir competitions in Gympie 
and Bathurst 

He composed a cantata selected for the 1888 International Centennial Exhibition in Melbourne.

Organist at St Mark's Cathedral, Melbourne 

King was choirmaster and organist at The Southport School in Surfer's Paradise for nine years, retiring in March 1933.

Devout Protestant academically eloquent on the humanities 

He was buried at Southport with second wife Elizabeth née Halford (1874–1949), with whom he had a daughter, Norah Yvonne Sylvia King (1902–1976).

Works
Alternatives 
Centennial Cantata 
Te Deum Laudamus and Jubilate Deo : set to music in the key of D 
Little Bird
The children's Eucharist : the Office for the Holy Communion : set in the key of F 
The Office for the Holy Communion set to music in the key of D / by Henry John King
Benedictus
Wilt thou be mine for ever love / lyrics by Russell Blackman 
Four works for piano and violin
Album of four song on funereal themes

References

1855 births
1934 deaths
Australian composers